The International Latin Music Hall of Fame (ILMHF)  was an annual event established in 1999 and held in New York City to honor artists who have largely contributed to the Latin music genre.

In addition to the induction into the Hall of Fame, the award ceremonies include Special Recognition Awards and Beny Moré Memorial Award. The last awards were held in 2003.

1999
The first Induction and Award ceremony was held on April 7, 1999. It honored the following inductees and recipients of the Special Recognition Awards:

1999 inductees
Tito Puente, Celia Cruz, Eddie Palmieri, Johnny Pacheco, Joe Cuba, Israel "Cachao" López, Johnny Ventura,  Orquesta Aragón, José Fajardo, Marco Antonio Muñiz, Ray Barretto, La Sonora Matancera.

1999 posthumous inductees
Miguel Faílde, Ignacio Piñeiro, Rafael Hernández, Ernesto Lecuona, Arsenio Rodríguez, Chano Pozo, Beny Moré, Perez Prado, Mario Bauza, Machito, Tito Rodríguez, Miguelito Valdés, Enrique Jorrín, Agustín Lara.

1999 Special Recognition Awards
record promoter Ralph Mercado
former Fania president Jerry Masucci
musical director of the East Harlem School of Music Johnny Colon
pianist-composer-conductor for the I Love Lucy show, Marco Rizo.

2000
The second Induction and Award ceremony was held on April 5, 2000. It honored the following inductees and recipients of the Special Recognition Awards:

2000 inductees
José Feliciano, Willie Colón, Mongo Santamaría, Ray Barretto, Cheo Feliciano, Hector Lavoe, Charlie Palmieri, Larry Harlow, La Lupe, Yomo Toro, Johnny Albino, Alfredo "Chocolate" Armenteros, Oscar D'León, Armando Manzanero, Myrta Silva, Bobby Capó, Daniel Santos, Luis Kalaff, Vicentico Valdés, Rafael Ithier and El Gran Combo de Puerto Rico, Miguel Matamoros, Rafael Cepeda, Julio Gutiérrez, Felipe Rodríguez, Rafael Cortijo, Ismael Rivera, Maria Teresa Vera, Chalía Herrera, Antonio Arcaño, Joseíto Mateo, Los Muñequitos de Matanzas, Orestes Lopez, Carlos Gardel, and Pedro Flores.

2000 Special Recognition Awards
Performer Harry Belafonte
Ry Cooder
Latin music historian Max Salazar
TV producer Willie Sanchez
Latin music radio host Joe Gaines
Journalist Miguel Perez
Artist and publisher Izzy Sanabria

2000 Lifetime Achievement Award winners
Israel "Cachao" Lopez
Chico O'Farrill

2001
The third annual ceremony and concert took place on April 4, 2001 at the Hostos Center for the Arts and Culture, Bronx, New York.

2001 inductees
Rubén Blades,  Buena Vista Social Club, Andy Montañez, Olga Guillot, Lucho Gatica, João Gilberto, Astor Piazolla, Hector Casanova, Ruth Fernandez, Candido Camero, Patato Valdes, Wilfrido Vargas, Armando Peraza, Francisco Aguabella, Tata Guines, Tite Curet Alonso, Vitín Avilés, Ray Romero, Maso Rivera and Rafael Solano

2001 posthumous inductees
Antônio Carlos Jobim, Xavier Cugat, Pedro Infante, Yayo "El Indio", Libertad Lamarque, Pete "El Conde" Rodríguez, Rita Montaner, Juan Morel Campos, Julio Jaramillo, Alfredo Valdés Sr., Sylvia Rexach, Felipe Pirela, Jose Mangual Sr., Toña la Negra, Pedro Vargas, Javier Solis, Antonio Mesa, Don Azpiazu, and Luis Carlos Meyer

2001 Special Recognition Awards
Rita Moreno, Cristóbal Díaz-Ayala, Rudy Mangual, Chata Gutiérrez, Chico Álvarez, Vicki Sola, Martin Cohen, and Ernie Ensley

2001 Lifetime Achievement Award winners
Johnny Albino
Graciela

2002
The fourth Induction and Award ceremony was held on April 10, 2002. It honored the following inductees and recipients of the Special Recognition Awards:

2002 inductees
Julio Iglesias, Carlos Santana, Dizzy Gillespie, Paquito D'Rivera, Danny Rivera, José José, Sandro, Vicente Fernández, Astrud Gilberto, Richie Ray, Willie Rosario, Cuco Valoy, Roberto Torres, Milly Quezada, Bobby Cruz, José Curbelo, Trio Vegabajeño, Bobby Rodríguez, La Sonora Ponceña, Leo Marini, Matilde Díaz, Aldemaro Romero, Mario Clavell, Elena Burke, Carmen Miranda, Gilberto Monroig, Alberto Socarrás, Félix Chappottín, Miguelito Cuní, Noro Morales, Joe Loco, Santos Colón, Louie Ramírez, Carmen Delia Dipini, Juan Tizol, René Hernández, and Lola Flores

2002 Special Recognition Awards
Miriam Colón
Pablo Guzmán

2002 Lifetime Achievement Award winners
Celia Cruz
Johnny Pacheco

2003
The fifth Induction and Award ceremony was held on April 2, 2003. It honored the following inductees and recipients of the Special Recognition Awards:

2003 inductees
Arturo Sandoval, Trini López, Juan Luis Guerra, Roberto Roena, Ismael Quintana, Raphael, Flaco Jimenez, Alberto Beltrán, Juan Gabriel, Nelson Ned, Ray Santos, Manny Oquendo, Justi Barretto, Pucho Brown, and Jose Luis Monero

2003 posthumous induction
Desi Arnaz, María Grever, Consuelo Velázquez, Eliseo Grenet, Gonzalo Roig, Álvaro Dalmar, Esther Borja, and Joseíto Fernández

2003 Special Recognition Awards
Former Palladium Dancers Cuban Pete, Augie and Margo; Millie Donay; artist Erich Padilla, and filmmaker Avenol Franco

2003 Lifetime Achievement Award winners
Johnny Ventura'

Beny Moré Memorial Award
The Beny Moré Memorial Award was an annual award, from 1999 to 2003, presented by the International Latin Music Hall of Fame to an individual who has helped to popularize Latin music throughout the world, in honor of the late Cuban artist Benny Moré. The International Latin Music Hall of Fame struggled in relation to the more established Billboard Latin Music Hall of Fame, and ceased operation before it was time for the 2004 Beny Moré Memorial Award.

Award winners
1999: Emilio Estefan, Gloria Estefan
2000: Johnny Pacheco
2001: Joe Cuba
2002: Larry Harlow
2003: José Alberto "El Canario"

See also
Billboard Latin Music Hall of Fame
Latin Grammy Hall of Fame
Latin Songwriters Hall of Fame
List of halls and walks of fame

References

Latin music awards
Music halls of fame
Music
Awards established in 1999
Awards disestablished in 2003
1999 establishments in New York City